The anterior or lingual surface of the epiglottis is curved forward, and covered on its upper, free part by mucous membrane which is reflected on to the sides and root of the tongue, forming a median and two lateral glossoepiglottic folds; the lateral folds are partly attached to the wall of the pharynx.

Additional Images

References

Tongue